Christine Nagel (born 7 October 1959) is a Swiss perfumer. She has served as the in-house perfumer at Hermès since 2016. Prior to joining Hermès she created designer perfume hits like Narciso Rodriguez for Her (2003, with Francis Kurkdjian) and Miss Dior Chérie (2005).

Nagel created Wood Sage & Sea Salt, one of 47 perfumes she created for Jo Malone London. She has been recognized with awards from the Fragrance Foundation France, the François Coty Foundation, and the Marie Claire International Fragrance Awards.

Early life and education 
Nagel was born on 7 October 1959 to an Italian mother and Swiss father,  Christine Nagel grew up in Geneva, Switzerland. Her earliest scent memory is of the Italian talc powder her mother bought to care for Nagel's baby brother (who also grew up to work in perfume). Her grandmother was a seamstress, sewing men's trousers, and the smell of freshly pressed pants formed another important early scent memory.

With the goal of becoming a midwife, Nagel began her studies in medicine, but discovered her true love was chemistry and switched to studying organic chemistry. This led to her interest in perfume. At the time this was an unusual route into the industry—most perfumers were men who grew up in the perfuming business in Grasse—but Nagel notes that since then perfumery schools have begun requiring training in chemistry as a prerequisite and more women have joined the industry.

Career

Early career
Nagel began her career in the research department of Swiss fragrance firm Firmenich, where she became enchanted with the strong emotional reactions a male perfumer colleague's work elicited from the women smelling it. The perfumer was Alberto Morillas, one of the giants of the perfume industry. Nagel asked to transfer to the perfumery section, but lacking the traditional background was told no and switched to chromatography instead, examining fragrances and their ingredient recipes on a molecular level. Subsequently, this has become a mechanized process but Nagel was one of the few in the world trained to recognize ingredients using only her nose.

Unable to advance any further at Firmenich, Nagel moved to Italy to strike out on her own. Within a year she held 60 percent of Italy's perfume contracts, including work for Fendi and Versace. She moved to Paris in 1997.

Nagel's bona fides were established through a versatile array of major hits like her 2003 collaboration with Francis Kurkdjian, Narciso Rodriguez for Her, the 2005 strawberry-and-popcorn confection Miss Dior Chérie, and fruity gourmand Armani Sì (2013); luxury lines like Guerlain's Les Élixirs Charnels; as well as niche perfume creations like 2011's “bizarre yet fascinating” Archive 69 for Etat Libre d'Orange, a camphorous rose and incense scent, and Wood Sage & Sea Salt (2014) for Jo Malone, a skin scent of salt lingering on the body after a day at the beach. (Nagel also created 46 other scents for Jo Malone, including the more conventional bestseller English Pear & Freesia in 2010.)

Hermès 
In 2014, Nagel went in-house at Hermès, joining Jean-Claude Ellena who had become the brand's first house perfumer in 2004. In 2016 Ellena, nearing retirement, handed the reins to Nagel and she became the sole in-house perfumer at Hermès and the director of olfactive creations for Hermès Parfums. This made her the second woman ever to hold an in-house perfumer position at a major luxury brand (the first was Mathilde Laurent at Cartier).

Two of Nagel's first Hermès releases were Galop (2016), a rose and leather scent inspired by Doblis, a suede-like leather kept in the Hermès vault-like cave of archival leather in Paris,. and Twilly (2017), a youthful fragrance that added ginger as a twist on a classic tuberose note. Critic Tania Sanchez (co-author of Perfumes: The Guide) said this made for a totally new perfume accord, "an androgynous fougere of fantastic beauty”. Other early Hermès fragrances include Eau des Merveilles Bleue (2017), a minéral and woody marine scent, and two additions to the Hermès line of colognes, Eau de Rhubarbe Écarlate (2016) and Eau de Citron Noir (2018).

Awards

In 2005, Nagel and Kurkdjian won the Fragrance Foundation France Award (called the FiFi Awards) for best women's fragrance for Narciso Rodriguez for Her. In 2012 they were recognized again for this fragrance with the “Twenty Years of Creativity” Prize at the 20th anniversary of the FiFi Awards: Narciso Rodriguez for Her was selected as the most iconic women's fragrance of the 20 the Foundation had honored with its annual prize over its 20-year history.

In 2007, Nagal won the Prix François Coty (then briefly retitled the Cosmetic Valley's International Fragrance Prize, but since returned to its original name).

In 2015, the Marie Claire International Fragrance Awards honored Nagel's creation Wood Sage & Sea Salt for Jo Malone as the year's most daring fragrance for women.

Influences
Nagel says her favorite perfume is always the “next one” she's working on, but she continues to feel the admiration for perfumers that first drew her to their profession, inspired by their creativity and the signature “personality” of their scents. Among contemporary perfumers, she names Morillas and Dominique Ropion as notable influences, but reserves a special place for path-breaking female perfumer Germaine Cellier, the creator of historic fragrances like Fracas (1948) and Bandit (1944) for Robert Piguet, at a time when the industry had almost no women. I would have liked to have had the audacity of Germaine Cellier … when she presented  in 1945 [...] It’s an incredible fragrance that, if it came out today in its original formula, would be extraordinarily modern.

Personal life
Nagel is married to Benoit Lapouza, also a perfumer. They have three children.

References

21st-century Swiss businesspeople
Perfumers
Swiss people of Italian descent
Living people
1959 births
Businesspeople from Geneva